Ahmadabad (also Romanized as Aḩmadābād) is a village in Jahadabad Rural District, in the Central District of Anbarabad County, Kerman Province, Iran. At the 2006 census, its population was 130, in 32 families.

References 

Populated places in Anbarabad County